Love Outside Andromeda was an indie rock band from Melbourne, Australia. The band was formed in 2000 as Andromeda, and released their debut EP, Umabel, in 2001. The title track from their second EP, Something White and Sigmund, appeared on the Triple J Hottest 100 2003 at No. 65. The band changed their name to Love Outside Andromeda to avoid confusion with the Swedish band of the same name. The band have since released two studio albums; Love Outside Andromeda (2004) and Longing Was a Safe Place to Hide (2006), both on Shock records. The band announced a hiatus at the start of 2007.

The band has reunited for a one-off show in 2019 as part of Melbourne Music Week, they also digitally released an EP containing demos from 2003 to 2005.

Members
Sianna Lee (vocals / guitar)
Jamie Slocombe (guitar / vocals)
Jesse Lee (bass)
Joe Hammond (drums)

Discography

Albums

EPs
Umabel (2001)
Something White and Sigmund (2003)
Acoustic Demos 2003-2005 (2019)

Singles
 Tongue Like A Tether (Radio Mix) (Promo Only) (2005)
 Measuring Tape (iTunes exclusive release) (2006)

References

External links

Official Website

Australian indie rock groups
Musical groups established in 2000